Coleman Rudolph (born October 22, 1970) is a former player in the NFL. He played for the New York Jets and the New York Giants. He was a 2nd round draft pick of the NY Jets in 1993 and suffered a knee injury his rookie year.  He played collegiately for the Georgia Tech football team. He was also inducted as a member of the Valdosta High School Hall of Fame in 2007.  He is a member of the Georgia Tech Hall of Fame and was an All American at Georgia Tech in 1992.  He also was All ACC in Football in 1991 and 1992.  He held Georgia Tech's Sack record at 28.5 and Tackle for Loss record at 52.5 for many years.  He was a member of the 1986 Valdosta High State and National Championship teams as well as the 1990 National Championship team at Georgia Tech under Bobby Ross.

He was named Male Co Athlete of the Year in the state of Georgia in 1992 along with Garrison Hearst and was recently voted as a "Top 50" greatest athletes in Georgia Tech History and named to the "All Georgia Tech Century Football Team".  He was a Captain his Senior year at Georgia Tech and named the "ABC Player of the Game" vs. North Carolina in 1992.  He was a first-team all Academic ACC member.

Following his NFL career, Coleman entered into private real estate investment business and then joined Morgan Stanley in 2001.  Coleman is currently a senior vice president at Morgan Stanley and is also a CFP (TM).  He resides in Atlanta and is married (Shannon) and has 3 children (Harris, Jake and Ella Grace) and 1 grandson (Beau).  He has coached at Blessed Trinity High School in Roswell where in 5 years they went to 3 State Championship games and won 2. Coleman is currently the defensive line coach at Fellowship Christian School in Roswell. His father, Jack Rudolph, also played in the NFL for the Boston Patriots and Miami Dolphins.

References

Living people
1970 births
American football defensive ends
Georgia Tech Yellow Jackets football players
New York Jets players
New York Giants players
People from Valdosta, Georgia
Players of American football from Georgia (U.S. state)